The Murder of My Sweet is a Swedish metal band, based in Stockholm and founded in 2007.

Band history
The Murder of My Sweet was founded in Stockholm in 2007 by drummer and producer Daniel Flores. It consists of Angelica Rylin (vocals), Patrik Janson (bass), Christopher Vetter (guitar), and Daniel Flores (drums and keyboards). Their debut single Bleed Me Dry reached 14th spot in the national Swedish singles chart. In January 2010, they released their debut album Divanity on the Italian label Frontiers Records.

Music
The lyrics deal with personal experiences, and the music is influenced by books and movie soundtracks.

Band name
The band's name was inspired by the 1944 film noir Murder, My Sweet.

Band members
 Angelica Rylin - vocals
 Mike Palace - guitar
 Patrik Janson - bass
 Daniel Flores - drums, keyboard, backing vocals

Discography
Studio albums
 2010: Divanity
 2012: Bye Bye Lullaby
 2015: Beth Out of Hell
 2017: Echoes of the Aftermath
 2019: Brave Tin World
 2021: A Gentleman's Legacy

Singles
 2009: "Bleed Me Dry"
 2010: "Tonight"
 2012: "Unbreakable"
 2015: "The Humble Servant"
 2015: "The Awakening"
 2017: "Personal Hell"

References

External links
 Official Homepage
 TMoMS at MySpace
 TMoMS at spirit-of-metal

Swedish symphonic metal musical groups
Swedish gothic metal musical groups
Musical groups established in 2006
Frontiers Records artists